Marvin Montgomery (born February 8, 1948) is a former American football offensive lineman in the National Football League (NFL) for the Denver Broncos, New Orleans Saints, and the Atlanta Falcons. He was the first offensive lineman selected in the 1971 NFL Draft at 12th in the first round by the Broncos. He played college football at the University of Southern California. He attended San Fernando Jr. High School.

References

1948 births
Living people
American football offensive guards
USC Trojans football players
Denver Broncos players
New Orleans Saints players
Atlanta Falcons players